Russkaya Khalan is a rural locality (a selo) and the administrative center of Russko-Khalanskoye Rural Settlement, Chernyansky District, Belgorod Oblast, Russia. The population was 1,033 as of 2010. There are 22 streets.

Geography 
Russkaya Khalan is located 9 km west of Chernyanka (the district's administrative centre) by road. Krasny Ostrov is the nearest rural locality.

References 

Rural localities in Chernyansky District